The 2010 Women's Hockey RaboTrophy was the fourth edition of the women's field hockey tournament. The RaboTrophy was held across four host cities in the Netherlands from 29 June to 4 July 2010, and featured four of the top nations in women's field hockey.

Argentina won the tournament for the first time, defeating the Netherlands 3–0 in the final.

Competition format
The four teams competed in a pool stage, played in a single round robin format. At the conclusion of the pool stage, the top two teams contested the final, while the remaining two competed for third place.

Teams
The following four teams competed for the title:

Officials
The following umpires were appointed by the International Hockey Federation to officiate the tournament:

 Karen Bennett (NZL)
 Soledad Iparraguirre (ARG)
 Wendy Stewart (CAN)
 Valentina Tomasi (ITA)
 Nicole Wajer (NED)

Results

Preliminary round

Fixtures

Classification round

Third and fourth place

Final

Statistics

Final standings

Goalscorers

References

External links
Official Website

RaboTrophy
Hockey RaboTrophy
Women's Hockey RaboTrophy
Hockey RaboTrophy
Hockey RaboTrophy